Bangladesh Railway Class 6500 is a class of 1,676 mm gauge diesel-electric locomotives owned by Bangladesh Railway. There are 36 locomotives of this class, all manufactured by the Banaras Locomotive Works of India. All locomotives of this class are in service.

Details 
In 2012, Bangladesh Railway ordered broad-gauge diesel-electric locomotives from India, modeled as WDM-3A. These 26 locomotives were imported in Bangladesh in 2012, 2013 and 2014. These locomotives have a power of 3100 hp, the highest for any locomotives in Bangladesh. They are fitted with AAR coupling and have a gear ratio of 65:18. These locomotives are marked as BED-30, which stands for broad gauge diesel-electric manufactured by DLW, engine with 30 * 100 hp (30) and numbered as 6501 - 6526.

On 27 July 2020, 10 WDM-3D units were imported from India marked as BED-33. The class name stands for broad gauge diesel-electric manufactured by DLW, engine with 33 * 100 hp (33) and numbered as 6527 - 6536. These locos have a 3300 hp power pack, with maximum available traction power of 2925 hp.

Liveries 
Class 6500 locomotives have the deep blue-yellow and sky blue-yellow livery. BED-30s have the deep blue-yellow livery and BED-33s have sky blue-yellow livery.

Usage 
Among all the class 6500 locomotives, BED-30 is basically used on both freight and passenger trains. Most high-end broad-gauge passenger trains like Padma Express, Banalata Express and Maitree Express are hauled by these locomotives. They are also used on some mail-express and commuter trains. On the other hand, BED-33 is usually only used on freight trains.

Gallery

BED-30

BED-33

References 

Locomotives of Bangladesh
Co-Co locomotives
Railway locomotives introduced in 2012
Banaras Locomotive Works locomotives
5 ft 6 in gauge locomotives